James Roy Dickey (born November 23, 1966) is an American executive from Austin, Texas and the former chairman of the Republican Party of Texas. He was elected by the 64-member Republican State Executive Committee meeting in Austin on June 3, 2017 and re-elected at the state convention on June 15, 2018. In his third campaign he was defeated by Allen West on July 20, 2020.

Early life and education
Dickey moved to Texas with his family when he was in elementary school and attended Polytechnic High School in Fort Worth where he graduated valedictorian of his class. Dickey then attended Stanford University, where he received bachelor's degrees in Political Science and English and later Baylor University, where he received an Master of Business Administration.

Dickey is CEO of JD Key, LLC, a business and political consulting firm, and a shareholder and board member of iManaging General Agency Holdings, LLC, the holding company of the insurance firm, iMGA, LLC. He has previously worked in the insurance industry for Kemper Insurance, Great American Insurance, and Republic Group.

Career

Travis County Republican Party
On March 4, 2014, Dickey was elected Travis County Republican Party chairman, in an uncontested Republican primary. He succeeded Rosemary Edwards, who served in that position from 2008 until Dickey's election.

Dickey ran for reelection as Travis County chair in 2016, but he was defeated in the March 1, 2016 election, 26,619 to 20,543 (56.4% to 43.6%) by Robert Morrow. Travis County Republican Party leaders immediately wanted to remove Morrow because he would wear a court jester's hat to county party meetings, speculated on famous assassinations and conspiracy theories, and promoted his book on the Clintons he co-authored with Roger Stone. With Dickey's assistance they implemented a plan that turned over operations of the Party to an executive committee and other officers of the Party.

Morrow held the Travis County chairmanship from March 1 to September 20, 2016. Dickey was re-elected as the Travis County chair after Morrow was disqualified by filing to run for U.S. President against Donald Trump. 
After Morrow's removal, Dickey defeated, 62–26, the political consultant Brendan Steinhauser of Austin, who managed the successful John Cornyn Senate re-election campaign in 2014. Steinhauser said he could not say he would vote for Trump. Dickey made it clear that Trump was not his original choice but that it was the duty of the Party Chair to support nominees elected by the voters.

Texas Republican Party 
On May 20, 2017, Tom Mechler of Amarillo, Texas announced his resignation, citing time constraints and business and family matters. Mechler set the election date for his successor less than two weeks later. Mechler's choice for party chair, Brenham, Texas wealth management executive Richard Scott "Rick" Figueroa, immediately announced his candidacy.

Dickey announced a few days later, and during the less than 10-day campaign Dickey and Figueroa participated in debates in Fort Worth, Houston, San Antonio, Round Rock, and Austin.

On June 3, 2017, the 62-member State Republican Executive Committee and the vice chair narrowly elected Dickey to succeed Mechler as state chair. Dickey received 32 votes to 31 for Rick Figueroa. Matt Mackowiak of Austin was elected to finish the one year remaining in Dickey's unexpired term as Travis County Republican Party Chairman.

Dickey ran for reelection in 2018 as Texas state party chair. He was opposed by Cindy Asche, a precinct chair in Collin County, Texas, north of Dallas. Asche loaned herself almost $200,000 to finance her campaign. On June 15, 2018, at the Republican Party of Texas convention in San Antonio, Dickey received the votes of 22 of the 31 Texas Senate districts. Asche of Frisco, Texas, a nurse and the chaplain for the Texas Federation of Republican Women, demanded that all of the delegates to the state convention vote on the state party chairman contest. Dickey won the vote of the full convention with 5,680 votes to Asche's 3,009 votes, 65.4% to 34.6%, growing Dickey's win to 24 of the 31 Senate districts. Asche ran a negative campaign focusing on the complaints of former state party employees and a 2004 Securities and Exchange Commission complaint against Dickey as a result of his past partnership at a hedge fund that lost $20 million in 2001 for the Art Institute of Chicago. The SEC filed a lawsuit alleging Dickey violated securities registration provisions, antifraud provisions, and broker-dealer registration provisions of the securities laws. The SEC settled the lawsuit with Dickey after he paid a fine without admitting guilt.

In July 2019, Dickey announced he would be running for reelection. He was challenged by former Congressman Allen West.

The state convention was originally scheduled for Houston in May 2020, but was postponed until mid-July to allow time for the county and Senate district conventions to be safely held and safeguards to be put in place.

After President Donald Trump proposed to move the 2020 Republican National Convention from North Carolina amid Coronavirus restrictions, Dickey volunteered Texas as a potential venue, saying, "Texans know how to and can safely have a big event like that as we reopen Texas." Dickey later mentioned Fort Worth, San Antonio, Dallas, and Houston as possible locations if the convention were hosted in Texas. The Republican National Committee ultimately decided to move its convention to Jacksonville, Florida.

On July 8, 2020, contrary to prior statements, Houston Mayor Sylvester Turner issued an order prohibiting the convention, scheduled for the following week. The next day the Party filed a lawsuit demanding specific performance of the lease between the state party and the Houston First, the management team of the Brown convention center. After losing that suit and its appeal to the Texas Supreme Court, the convention had to be held virtually for the first time ever.

On July 20, 2020, during that virtual convention, he was defeated by Allen West, who won the vote in 22 of the 31 Senate districts.

Private life 
Dickey married his wife, Lynda, in 1989, and they live in Spicewood, Texas, in unincorporated Travis County, Texas in the Texas Hill Country. They have three children.

References

1966 births
American businesspeople in insurance
American Christians
Baylor University alumni
Politicians from Austin, Texas
Politicians from Fort Worth, Texas
Place of birth missing (living people)
Living people
Stanford University alumni
Texas Republican state chairmen
Texas Republicans